Corydalis (from Greek korydalís "crested lark") is a genus of about 470 species of annual and perennial herbaceous plants in the family Papaveraceae, native to the temperate Northern Hemisphere and the high mountains of tropical eastern Africa. They are most diverse in China and the Himalayas, with at least 357 species in China.

Ecology
Corydalis species are used as food plants by the larvae of some Lepidoptera species (butterflies), especially the clouded Apollo.

Toxicity
Corydalis cava and some other tuberous species contain the alkaloid bulbocapnine, which is occasionally used in medicine but scientific evidence is lacking in the correct dosages and side effects.

Many of the species in Corydalis contain other toxins and alkaloids like canadine, which blocks calcium. The species C. caseana is poisonous to livestock.

Taxonomy

Current species
There are about 470 species, including:

 Corydalis ambigua
 Corydalis aurea
 Corydalis buschii
 Corydalis bracteata
 Corydalis cava
 Corydalis caseana
 Corydalis cheilanthifolia – ferny corydalis
 Corydalis chelidoniifolia
 Corydalis darwasica
 Corydalis elegans
 Corydalis filistipes
 Corydalis flavula
 Corydalis flexuosa
 Corydalis heterocarpa
 Corydalis incisa
 Corydalis integra
 Corydalis linstowiana
 Corydalis micrantha
 Corydalis nobilis
 Corydalis ochotensis
 Corydalis omeiana
 Corydalis orthoceras
 Corydalis palaestina
 Corydalis pallida
 Corydalis pauciflora
 Corydalis pauciovulata
 Corydalis rutifolia
 Corydalis saxicola
 Corydalis scouleri
 Corydalis solida – fumewort
 Corydalis vittae
 Corydalis wilsonii
 Corydalis yanhusuo

Former species
Several former Corydalis have been moved to new genera:
 Pseudofumaria
 Corydalis lutea = Pseudofumaria lutea – yellow corydalis
 Corydalis ochroleuca = Pseudofumaria alba

 Capnoides
 Corydalis sempervirens = Capnoides sempervirens

References

External links

 
Medicinal plants
Papaveraceae genera